Samantha Ahn Kolowratová, also known as Samantha "Sammy" Kolowrat (born 12 July 1996) is a Czech ice hockey player and member of the  Czech national team, currently playing with Brynäs IF Dam of the Swedish Women's Hockey League (SDHL).

Playing career 
Across 141 NCAA games with the Vermont Catamounts women's ice hockey program, she scored 28 points and served as the team's captain in her final season. She was named to the Hockey East All-Academic Team in 2016 and 2017.

After spending a year away from hockey completing her master's degree, she signed with the Metropolitan Riveters ahead of the 2020–21 NWHL season.

International 
Kolowratová has represented the Czech Republic at the IIHF Women's World Championships in 2013, 2016, 2017, 2019, 2021, and at the Division I Group A tournament in 2015. She also participated in three qualifiers for the Winter Olympic Games, including the qualification tournament for the women's ice hockey tournament at the 2022 Winter Olympics, at which the Czech Republic qualified for the first time in team history.

As a junior player with the Czech national under-18 team, she participated in the IIHF Women's U18 World Championships in 2012, 2013, and 2014.

Personal life 
Kolowratová has a bachelor's degree in biological science and a master's degree in pharmacology from the University of Vermont. She is a descendant of the Kolowrat-Krakowsky Bohemian aristocratic family.

References

External links
 

1996 births
Living people
Czech women's ice hockey defencemen
Ice hockey people from Prague
Brynäs IF Dam players
Metropolitan Riveters players
Vermont Catamounts women's ice hockey players
Choate Rosemary Hall alumni
Czech expatriate ice hockey people
Czech expatriate ice hockey players in Sweden
Czech expatriate ice hockey players in the United States
Olympic ice hockey players of the Czech Republic
Ice hockey players at the 2022 Winter Olympics